Nimmi Harasgama is an actor, writer, and producer. The British National Television Awards nominated her for best "Drama Performance" for her portrayal of Nurse Mari in ITV's The Good Karma Hospital. She made her screen-debut through the English movie Mother Teresa in 1997 by portraying a supporting character. Her first appearance in Sri Lankan cinema. was as the lead in the Sinhalese movie Ira Madiyama (2003) for which she won Best Performance/Best Actress at several international and national award ceremonies - these included the 2004 International Film Festival of Las Palmas and 2006 SIGNIS Salutation Awards Ceremony.

Personal life
Nimmi Harasgama was born in Colombo, Sri Lanka to a Sinhalese father and Tamil mother. She has two siblings from her father's first marriage: the artist Nelun Harasgama and Prithi Harasgama. When she was five her family moved to the UK where she attended the Westwood House School for Girls a Church of England school. Nimmi attended Goldsmiths, University of London where she received a B.A. (HONS) in Drama and Theatre Arts. In 2001 she received a scholarship to an Acting in Film Workshop at the New York Film Academy.

Career
After appearing in a supportive role in the English movie Mother Teresa: In the Name of God's Poor in 1997, Nimmi made her first step into Sri Lankan cinema in 2003 playing the lead role in Prasanna Vithanage’s film Ira Madiyama (August Sun) where she played the role of a woman whose husband was missing in action. Her successful performance brought her positive reviews and several accolades, including the Best Actress award at the 2004 International Film Festival in Spain. Following Ira Madiyama, she appeared in another film about the life of Mother Teresa: Mother Teresa of Calcutta (2003) which was filmed in Sri Lanka and Italy. 

In 2012 she appeared in her first Tamil speaking role in Enakkum oru per (I Too Have a Name), a short film written and directed by Suba Sivakumaran, which was nominated for the Golden Bear for Best Short at the Berlin International Film Festival in Germany. In 2011 she partnered with ETV, a Sri Lankan television station, to star in the chat show Put a Chat With Auntie Netta based on a character she created.

In 2020 she played the female lead in Deepa Mehta's film Funny Boy based on Shyam Selvadurai's book of the same name. Her performance garnered rave reviews: "Accomplished British-Sri Lankan actress Nimmi Harasgama (also seen in August Sun and the short I Too Have a Name) stands out as the bold, married Nalini..."

Filmography

Television

References

External links 

Living people
Sinhalese actresses
Sri Lankan film actresses
21st-century Sri Lankan actresses
Year of birth missing (living people)